Song Duan (born 2 August 1995) is a female Chinese football player who is a striker.

International goals

References

External links 
 

1995 births
Living people
Women's association football forwards
Chinese women's footballers
China women's international footballers
Footballers from Dalian
2019 FIFA Women's World Cup players